Hot Stuff is a 1971 animated short directed and animated by Zlatko Grgic 
 and written by Don Arioli. Produced by the National Film Board of Canada for the Dominion Fire Commission, a department of Public Works Canada, the nine-minute short on fire safety offers a humorous look  at the origins, benefits and dangers of fire.

Production
Grgic was recruited by for the NFB by producers Robert Verrall and Wolf Koenig after they saw his film Scabies. Much of Hot Stuff'''s humour had been initially improvised; Gerald Budner, who was himself an animator, ad-libbed voices for two of the characters, a snake and a cat. Arioli had been annoyed with Budner's banter, but Koenig insisted on retaining these asides. Grgic was also given freedom to improvise by the producers.

ReleaseHot Stuff was one of seven NFB animated shorts acquired by the American Broadcasting Company, marking the first time NFB films had been sold to a major American television network. It aired on ABC in the fall of 1971 as part of the children's television show Curiosity Shop, executive produced by Chuck Jones. It also aired (minus the opening & closing credits) on The Great Space Coaster'' in the 1980s.

Awards
 International Animation Film Festival, New York: Grand Prix - Silver Praxinoscope, Educational, 1972
World Festival of Animated Films, Zagreb: Best Educational Film, 1972
 Atlanta Film Festival: Gold Medal, Safety, 1972
 Melbourne Film Festival, Melbourne: Diploma of Merit, 1972
 International Short Film Festival Oberhausen, Oberhausen, Germany: Diploma of the International Council of Graphic Design Associations, 1972
 National Committee on Films for Safety, Chicago: Bronze Plaque, 1972
23rd Canadian Film Awards, Toronto: Best Screenplay, Fiction, Don Arioli, 1972

References

External links
 Watch Hot Stuff at NFB.ca
 
 Hot Stuff on Amazon

1971 films
National Film Board of Canada animated short films
Fire prevention
Sponsored films
Social guidance films
Canadian comedy short films
1970s animated short films
1971 animated films
Films produced by Robert Verrall
1970s Canadian films
Canadian educational films